Martin Su Yao-wen (born 9 November 1959) is the current serving Roman Catholic bishop of the Roman Catholic diocese of Taichung, Taiwan.

Early life 
Martin was born in Kaohsiung, Taiwan on 9 November 1959. He studied at Holy Spirit minor seminary in Taichung, Taipei major seminary and completed his philosophy and theology at Fu Jen University.

Priesthood 
On 8 June 1989, Martin was ordained a priest for the Roman Catholic diocese of Taichung, Taiwan. He also studied at St. Louis University, San Francisco, U.S.A., for a diploma in Religious Education. He acquired Licentiate in Religious Education from Fordham University, New York.

Episcopate 
Pope Benedict XVI appointed Martin as bishop of the Roman Catholic diocese of Taichung on 25 June 2007 and he was consecrated a bishop on 25 September 2007 by Bishop Joseph Wang Yu-jung.

References

External links

1959 births
21st-century Roman Catholic bishops in Taiwan
Bishops appointed by Pope Benedict XVI
Fordham University alumni
Fu Jen Catholic University alumni
Living people